Raptadu Assembly constituency is a constituency of the Andhra Pradesh Legislative Assembly, India. It is one among 6 constituencies in the Anantapur district.

Thopudurthi Prakash Reddy of YSR Congress Party is currently representing the constituency.

Overview
It is part of the Hindupur Lok Sabha constituency along with another six Vidhan Sabha segments, namely, Madakasira, Hindupur, Penukonda, Puttaparthi, Dharmavaram and Kadiri in Sri Sathya Sai district.

Mandals

Members of Legislative Assembly

Election results

Assembly Elections 2009

Assembly elections 2014

Assembly Elections 2019

 
 

 List of constituencies of Andhra Pradesh Legislative Assembly

See also
 List of constituencies of Andhra Pradesh Legislative Assembly

References

Assembly constituencies of Andhra Pradesh